The Gerber/Hart Library and Archives (or "The Henry Gerber–Pearl M. Hart Library: The Midwest Lesbian & Gay Resource Center"), founded in 1981, is the largest circulating library of gay and lesbian titles in the Midwestern United States. Located in Chicago's Rogers Park neighborhood, it houses over 14,000 volumes, 800 periodical titles, and 100 archival collections. The Gerber/Hart Library and Archives were inducted into the Chicago Gay and Lesbian Hall of Fame in 1996.

Although a private non-profit, the library has received taxpayer funds for its continuing operation from Illinois' "Fund for the Future," including a $25,000 grant in 1999.

References

Further reading

External links 
 Official Gerber/Hart Library web site

1981 establishments in Illinois
LGBT culture in Chicago
LGBT museums and archives
Libraries in Chicago
Libraries established in 1981
Library associations based in Chicago
Research libraries in the United States
Inductees of the Chicago LGBT Hall of Fame